Iglesia de San Francisco de Asis is a Roman Catholic church in San Francisco District, Goicoechea canton, San José, Costa Rica. It is dedicated to Saint Francis of Assisi.

Churches in Costa Rica
Buildings and structures in San José, Costa Rica